Parumer See is a lake in Mecklenburg, Mecklenburg-Vorpommern, Germany. At an elevation of 3.6 m, its surface area is 2.07 km².

External links 
 

Lakes of Mecklenburg-Western Pomerania